Lightning bolt often refers to:
 Lightning strike, an electric discharge between the atmosphere and the ground
 Thunderbolt, a symbolic representation of lightning accompanied by a loud thunderclap

Lightning bolt may also refer to:

Music
 Lightning Bolt (band), an American noise rock duo
 Lightning Bolt Tour, to promote the Pearl Jam album Lightning Bolt

Albums and songs
 Lightning Bolt (Lightning Bolt album)
 Lightning Bolt (Pearl Jam album)
 "Lightning Bolt" (song), by Jake Bugg

Other uses
 Lightning Bolt (film), an Italian-Spanish spy movie
 Lightning Bolt (interface), a computer display and docking standard
 Lightning Bolt (motorcycle), an American world land-speed record breaker
 Lightning Bolt, nickname and victory pose of Jamaican sprinter Usain Bolt

See also
 Bolt (disambiguation)
 Lightning (disambiguation)
 Thunderbolt (disambiguation)